QuickPlayer may refer to:
QuickPlay by Hewlett-Packard
QuickPlay by Quickplay Media
QuickTime Player, part of QuickTime